Abu El Namras is a city in the Giza Governorate, Egypt. Its population was estimated at 86,000 people in 2020.

The old name of the city in Bunumrus (from ).

References 

Populated places in Giza Governorate